The Shire of Dimboola was a local government area in the Wimmera region of western Victoria, Australia.

History

Dimboola was originally part of the Shire of Wimmera, which was first incorporated in 1862. It became part of the Shire of Lowan, when it was separately incorporated on 31 December 1875, and on 2 April 1885, Dimboola was established as a shire in its own right.

Being in a fairly remote region, for its first 30 years, Dimboola's boundaries were fairly flexible and adjusted frequently;
 23 May 1890 — Wimmera annexed Cannum, Wallup and Kewell West, which became Wimmera's North Riding;
 12 May 1893 — Borung annexed Dimboola's East Riding;
 28 May 1897 — Karkarooc annexed a northeastern part of Dimboola;
 1 November 1911 — Dimboola and a number of other western shires gave up remote areas, to form the Shire of Walpeup.

On 14 December 1932, Dimboola gained parts of the West Riding from the Shire of Karkarooc.

On 20 January 1995, the Shire of Dimboola was abolished, and along with the Shire of Lowan, was merged into the newly created Shire of Hindmarsh.

Wards

The Shire of Dimboola was divided into four ridings, each of which elected three councillors:
 North Riding
 Central Riding
 South Riding
 West Riding

Towns and localities
 Antwerp
 Arkona
 Dalmalee
 Dimboola*
 Ellam
 Gerang
 Jeparit
 Kenmare
 Kiata
 Lake Albacutya
 Lake Hindmarsh
 Little Desert NP
 Katyil
 Pella
 Peppers Plains
 Pullut
 Rainbow
 Tarranyurk
 Werrap

* Council seat.

Population

* Estimates in 1958, 1983 and 1988 Victorian Year Books.

References

External links
 Victorian Places - Dimboola Shire

Dimboola
1885 establishments in Australia